The Cerro Cedral is the second highest mountain of the Cerros de Escazú, Costa Rica with . Cedral means 'cedar forest' referring to an endangered tree species locally known as Cedro Dulce, which occurs there.

This mountain marks the southern limit of Escazú as a canton and of San José as a province.

The Agres river rises from the Cerro Cedral.

On January 15, 1990 a Sansa Airlines flight crashed into the Cerro Cedral killing all 23 crew and passengers on board. The pilot, flying a CASA C-212 Aviocar, was later determined to be under excessive fatigue at the moment.

See also
Rabo de Mico
Cerro Pico Alto
Cerro Pico Blanco
Cerro San Miguel

References

Mountains of the Cerros de Escazú
Mountains of Costa Rica